Ouzinkie Airport  is a state-owned public-use airport serving Ouzinkie, a city on Spruce Island in the Kodiak Island Borough of the U.S. state of Alaska.

The airport received national media attention in 2009 after being slotted to receive $15 million in federal stimulus money to construct a new airstrip. The new airport opened in 2010.

As per Federal Aviation Administration records, Ouzinkie Airport had 2,071 passenger boardings (enplanements) in calendar year 2008, 2,999 enplanements in 2009, and 2,784 in 2010. It is included in the National Plan of Integrated Airport Systems for 2011–2015, which categorized it as a general aviation facility based on enplanements in 2008 (the commercial service category requires at least 2,500 per year).

Facilities 
Ouzinkie Airport covers an area of 170 acres (69 ha) at an elevation of 100 feet (30 m) above mean sea level. It has one runway designated 8/26 with a gravel surface measuring 3,300 by 60 feet (1,006 x 18 m).

The former location had one runway designated 11/29 with a gravel surface measuring 2,085 by 80 feet (636 x 24 m). For the 12-month period ending December 31, 2006, it had 42 aircraft operations per month: 60% general aviation and 40% air taxi.

Airline and destinations 

Airlines with scheduled passenger service to non-stop destinations:

Statistics

References

External links 
 Topographic map from USGS The National Map
 Airport diagram from FAA Alaska Region

Airports in Kodiak Island Borough, Alaska
Airports established in 2010